The Cambridgeshire County Football League, currently styled as the Cambridgeshire Fire Places Cambridgeshire County League for sponsorship purposes, is a football competition covering Cambridgeshire and western parts of Suffolk, Norfolk and northwestern parts of Essex in England. It has a total of 16 divisions, headed by the Premier Division. The Premier Division sits at step 7 (or level 11) of the National League System. Below the Premier Division lies the Senior A Division and Senior B Division. Below those two leagues, the structure splits into two parallel ladders of five divisions each. The Premier Division champions may apply for promotion to the Eastern Counties League Division One, the United Counties League or the Spartan South Midlands League but few take up the offer.
For instance, at the end of the 2021–22 season, Great Shelford, traditionally one of the stronger sides in the league, were the Premier Division champions, but did not apply for promotion. However, Eaton Socon FC who finished fourth in the same season, were successful in their application to join the SSMFL Division One as they were the only club with the correct ground grading required for step 6 football.

Member clubs 2022–23
The constitution for season 2022-2023 is as follows:

Kershaw Premier Division
Bassingbourn | Cambridge University Press | Cherry Hinton | Ely City Reserves | Foxton | Great Shelford | Hemingfords United | Huntingdon United | Linton Granta | March Town United Reserves | Newmarket Town F.C. Reserves | Over Sports | West Wratting | Wisbech St. Mary | Witchford 96

Kershaw Senior Division A
AFC Emneth | Bluntisham Rangers | Brampton | Cambridge University Press Reserves | Cherry Hinton Reserves | Eaton Socon Reserves | Fordham | Hundon F.C. (Sat) | Isleham United | Milton | Orwell | Soham Town Rangers FC Reserves | Somersham Town | Thaxted Rangers

Kershaw Senior Division B
Burwell | Chatteris Town | Comberton United | Debden | Great Shelford Reserves | Hardwick FC | Histon FC Reserves | Lakenheath F.C. Reserves (Sat) | Linton Granta Reserves | March Town United 'A' | Melbourn FC | Sawston Rovers | St Ives Town FC Reserves | Swavesey Institute

Kershaw Division 1A
Abington United | Barrington | Cottenham United | Foxton Reserves | Hardwick FC Reserves | Litlington Athletic | Longstanton FC | Milton Reserves | Mott MacDonald | Puddlebrook 68 F.C. (Sat) | Steeple Morden | West Wratting Reserves

Kershaw Division 1B
Alconbury | Benwick Athletic | Buckden | Exning United F.C. (Sat) | Eynesbury Rovers Reserves | Fenstanton | Gamlingay United | Great Paxton | Hemingfords United Reserves | Needingworth United | Over Sports Reserves | Wimblington | Witchford 96 Reserves

Kershaw Division 2A
Cambourne Town | Clare Town | Eaton Socon 'A' | Fulbourne Institute | Girton United | Guilden Morden | Histon Hornets | Linton Granta 'A' | Sawston Phoenix | Sawston United | Thurlow Youth F.C. (Sat) | Tuddenham Rovers | Whittlesford United 

Kershaw Division 2B
Brampton Reserves | Chatteris Town Reserves | Crusaders 2019 | Fen Tigers Engineers | Hartford Rangers | Huntingdon United Reserves | Littleport Town | Manea United | Papworth | Stretham | The Eagle (Ely) 

Kershaw Division 3A
Ashdon United (Sat) | Balsham | Barrington Reserves | Cambridge Ambassadors | Comberton United Reserves | Duxford United | Haverhill Town | Hundon F.C. Reserves (Sat) | Melbourn Reserves | Papworth Reserves | Sawston Lightning | Sawston Rovers Reserves | Thaxted Rangers Reserves | Wilbrahams

Kershaw Division 3B
AFC Ely | AFC Emneth Reserves | Benwick Athletic Reserves | Bluntinsham Rangers Reserves | Fenstanton Reserves | Hemingfords United 'A' | Houghton & Wyton | Isleham United Reserves | Lakenheath Casuals F.C. A.F.C. | Mepal Sports | Outwell Swifts | Soham Town Rangers FC 'A' | West Row Gunners F.C. | Wicken Amateurs 

Mead Plant & Grab 4A Division
Ashdon United Reserves | Bassingbourn Reserves | Comberton United 'A' | Duxford United Reserves | FC Kennett | Great Paxton Reserves | Haverhill Town 'A' | Litlington Athletic Reserves | Little Paxton | Milton 'A' | Sawston United Reserves | Thurlow Reserves | Walden United | Whittlesford United Reserves 

Mead Plant & Grab 4B Division
Alconbury Reserves | Chatteris Town 'A' | Doddington Three Lions | Guyhirn | Hartford Rangers Reserves | Littleport Town Reserves | Manea United Reserves | March Academy | Soham United | Stretham Reserves | Swavesey Institute Reserves | Upwell Town | Waterbeach Colts | Willingham Wolves (Sat)

Recent Premier Division champions
1999–2000: Over Sports
2000–01: Histon Reserves (promoted)
2001–02: Sawston United
2002–03: Sawston United
2003–04: Fulbourn Institute
2004–05: Fulbourn Institute (promoted)
2005–06: Sawston United
2006–07: Great Shelford
2007–08: Waterbeach
2008–09: Fulbourn Institute
2009–10: Fulbourn Institute
2010–11: Lakenheath
2011–12: Linton Granta
2012–13: Great Shelford
2013–14: Over Sports
2014–15: Great Shelford
2015–16: Great Shelford
2016–17: Hardwick
2017–18: West Wratting
2018–19: Great Shelford
2019-20: Season declared NULL AND VOID
2020-21: Season declared NULL AND VOID - Cup competitions being played

References

External links
Results & tables Full Time

League Information

 
Football leagues in England
Football in Cambridgeshire